Miss Asia Pacific International 2019 (MAPI) is the fourth edition of beauty pageant, Miss Asia Pacific International. 
The event was held on October 9, at the Newport Performing Arts Theater of Resorts World Manila in Pasay, Philippines. Spain's Chaiyenne Huisman was crowned the title. Thu Hien was awarded the Missosology’s Choice award.

Results

Order of Announcements

Top 25

Top 10

Top 5

 Continental Queens 

Africa
 - Miche'le-Ange Minkata

Americas
 - Jessica Victoria Cianchino

Asia
 - Klyza Castro

Europe
 - Lauralyn Vermeersch

 Oceania 
 - Chelsea Martin

International delegates
List of 54 delegates:

References

External links
Official website

2019 beauty pageants
2019